UWF may refer to:
The University of West Florida
The Universal Wrestling Federation (Bill Watts), an American professional wrestling promotion, started by Bill Watts
The Universal Wrestling Federation (Herb Abrams), an American professional wrestling promotion, started by Herb Abrams
One of a number of related Japanese pro wrestling promotions called Universal Wrestling Federation (Japan)
The Urban Wrestling Federation, an inactive American professional wrestling promotion
Woodfree uncoated paper